Sylvain Andre (born 14 October 1992) is a French male BMX rider, representing his nation at international competitions. He competed in the time trial event at the 2015 UCI BMX World Championships.

References

External links
 
 
 
 
 

1992 births
Living people
French male cyclists
BMX riders
Olympic cyclists of France
Cyclists at the 2020 Summer Olympics
European Games competitors for France
Cyclists at the 2015 European Games
21st-century French people